Košeca is a village and municipality in Ilava District in the Trenčín Region of north-western Slovakia.

History
In historical records the village was first mentioned in 1272.

Geography
The municipality lies at an altitude of 255 metres and covers an area of 18.943 km². It has a population of about 2474 people.

Part of the cadastral municipality of Košeca is also Nozdrovice.

Genealogical resources

The records for genealogical research are available at the state archive "Statny Archiv in Bytca, Slovakia"

 Roman Catholic church records (births/marriages/deaths): 1750-1895 (parish A)
 Lutheran church records (births/marriages/deaths): 1783-1895 (parish B)

See also
 List of municipalities and towns in Slovakia

References

External links

  Official page
https://web.archive.org/web/20090412234949/http://www.statistics.sk/mosmis/eng/run.html
Surnames of living people in Koseca

Villages and municipalities in Ilava District